Aidan Thomas Stone (born 20 July 1999) is an English professional footballer who plays as a goalkeeper for  club Port Vale.

He began his career at Sporting Khalsa and Brocton, before being signed by Burnley, from where he was loaned out to Lancaster City. He joined Mansfield Town in June 2019 and made his English Football League debut in February 2020. He signed with Port Vale in June 2021 and helped the club to win promotion out of League Two via the play-offs in 2022.

Career

Early career
Born in Stafford, Stone attended Kingsmead School and Wolgarston High School. He played as a centre-half in his youth until he put on extra weight at the age of 14 and decided to concentrate on goalkeeping. He played for Sporting Khalsa. Having failed a three-month trial spell at Walsall at the age of 16, he joined Midland League side Brocton in February 2016, winning the club's young player and players’ player of the year awards during the 2016–17 Premier Division relegation campaign. He won two caps for the England Schoolboys U18s team in 2017, playing against Northern Ireland and Australia in England's victorious Centenary Shield campaign.

Burnley
Stone was signed by Burnley to a one year-contract with the option of a further 12 months in June 2017. He signed a new one-year contract in April 2018. He joined Lancaster City in July 2018 in a loan deal to run the first half of the 2018–19 season. He made one FA Trophy appearance at Lancaster. He played for Burnley U23s in the 2019 Lancashire Senior Cup final, which ended in a 2–0 defeat to Blackburn Rovers. He credited Nick Pope, Joe Hart and Tom Heaton for having a positive influence on his career, saying "it’s nice to have them as colleagues but also as friends".

Mansfield Town
Stone signed for Mansfield Town on 24 June 2019 after impressing manager John Dempster on trial, and was expected to provide competition for first-choice goalkeeper Conrad Logan whilst Bobby Olejnik recovered from a knee injury. He made his senior debut at Field Mill on 27 August in a Football League Trophy game against Everton U21; the match finished 1–1 with Everton winning the resulting penalty shoot-out 4–1. On 1 December, he joined Northern Premier League Division One North West club Widnes on a one-month loan deal, having been recommended to the club by Mansfield's Head of Recruitment Andy Burgess. He played five games for the "Whites". In January 2020, Mansfield manager Graham Coughlan said he was hoping to give Stone some more first-team experience before the end of the 2019–20 season. He made his English Football League debut on 15 February, in a 1–0 home win over Newport County.

He made 24 appearances in the 2020–21 season and was praised by manager Nigel Clough in April for recovering from a costly error in a 1–1 draw with Newport County to pick up the man of the match award for his performance in a 1–0 win at Stevenage. The following month he was named as the club's Football in the Community's PFA Community Champion for his championing of a healthy eating campaign with Wynndale Primary School. However the club confirmed that Stone would not be offered a new contract. Stone described the decision as "a bit of a shock" as "I thought I'd done enough to earn a new contract".

Port Vale
On 25 June 2021, Port Vale announced that they had signed Stone on a one-year deal to start on 1 July, with the option of a further 12 months; manager Darrell Clarke said that "we are pleased to have secured Aidan's future at Vale Park and expect to have a healthy dose of competition now in the goalkeeping positions, following Lucas Covolan's arrival earlier in the week." He was given the chance to secure a starting place after Covolan was sent off on the opening day of the 2021–22 season. Covolan was returned to the starting eleven upon serving his suspension, only to be sent off yet again in January; Stone had to then sit on the bench behind new loan signing Tomáš Holý until giving an impressive performance upon being given his first league start in two months on 12 March. He remained in goal for the rest of the season and saved three penalties in the penalty shoot-out victory over Swindon Town in the play-off semi-final. He started in the play-off final at Wembley Stadium as Vale secured promotion with a 3–0 victory over Mansfield Town; Michael Baggaley of The Sentinel wrote that "[Stone had an] early mix up with Gibbons but retrieved the situation with a save from Murphy... spilled a ball into the area but Hall cleared off the line.... [Stone] has played a huge part in getting Vale this far".  The club named him as Young Player of the Year and invoked their option to extend his contract by a further 12 months in June 2022. The club then gave Stone a new deal to run until 2024.

He lost his first-team spot to loan signing Jack Stevens early in the 2022–23 campaign, with Clarke claiming that further work with coach Carlo Nash would bring out Stone's potential as a "top half of League One goalie". Stevens remained first-choice goalkeeper for much of the campaign, though Stone was returned to the first eleven in February, at which stage Clarke said that there was little to choose between the two.

Style of play
Stone is a very vocal goalkeeper with good distribution skills.

Career statistics

Honours
Burnley
Lancashire Senior Cup runner-up: 2019

Port Vale
EFL League Two play-offs: 2022

References

1999 births
Living people
Sportspeople from Stafford
English footballers
England schools international footballers
Association football goalkeepers
Sporting Khalsa F.C. players
Brocton F.C. players
Burnley F.C. players
Lancaster City F.C. players
Mansfield Town F.C. players
Widnes F.C. players
Port Vale F.C. players
English Football League players